Hicham Boudaoui (born 23 September 1999) is an Algerian professional footballer who plays as a midfielder for Ligue 1 club Nice and the Algeria national team.

Club career
On 6 January 2018, Boudaoui made his professional debut for Paradou AC, coming as a second-half substitute in a league match against USM Alger.

In September 2019, he joined Ligue 1 side Nice.

International career
Boudaoui made his debut for the Algeria national team on 27 December 2018 in a friendly against Qatar, as a starter. He was named in Algeria's national team squad for the 2019 Africa Cup of Nations in Egypt.

Career statistics

International

Honours
Nice
 Coupe de France runner-up: 2021–22

Algeria
 Africa Cup of Nations: 2019

Individual
 Nice Young Player of the Season: 2019–20

References

External links
 

1999 births
Living people
People from Béchar
Association football midfielders
Algeria under-23 international footballers
Algeria youth international footballers
Algeria international footballers
Algerian footballers
Algerian Ligue Professionnelle 1 players
Ligue 1 players
Paradou AC players
OGC Nice players
Expatriate footballers in France
Algerian expatriate sportspeople in France
2019 Africa Cup of Nations players
21st-century Algerian people